The Duke Smart Home (previously the Home Depot Smart Home) is a live-in laboratory and residence hall at Duke University.

History 
In 2003, Mark Younger, an undergraduate student at the Duke University Pratt School of Engineering conceived the idea in a senior thesis.

By 2006, The Home Depot had announced a $2 million sponsorship. At the time, Home Depot's senior vice president of merchandising stated that the Smart Home would help the hardware and furnishings retailer "understand the technology behind these solutions and ultimately to bring this technology to the consumer market."

Construction began in 2007 and the building was opened in 2008. At the time, the building was the first "live-in" smart-home laboratory on a college campus. In the years since, the corporate name was dropped.

In 2018, the Smart Home celebrated its 10-year anniversary.

Facility 
The facility is a LEED Platinum certified 6000 square feet residence hall at Duke. The home has a Green Roof which is integrated into the rain-water recollection system, which provides up to 2500 gallons of water for irrigation, toilets, and washing machines. Solar panels provide 100% of the heating needs and more than 30% of the energy used in the house.

The house has living space and laboratories for 10 undergraduates, where they are able to conduct experiments relating to the engineering of smart-homes as every-day life. The university refers to the space as a "living laboratory."

References 

Duke University campus
Houses in Durham, North Carolina
University and college dormitories in the United States
Leadership in Energy and Environmental Design platinum certified buildings
Sustainable buildings in the United States
2008 establishments in North Carolina